Suite for the Seven Mountains (released April 15, 2008 in UK by the label Edition Records – CALI074CD) is the debut album of the Norwegian saxophonist Marius Neset and his «People Are Machines».

Reception 
The review by the Marlbank.net awarded the album 4 stars, and the reviewer Erik Steinskog of the Norwegian newspaper Bergens Tidende awarded the album 4 stars (dice).

Review 
The debut album of the Norwegian saxophonist Marius Neset is a suite for jazz quartet and string quartet. Neset give us an elevated chamber music experience including seven movements with consistently strong compositions

Kirkemusikki Bergen in the review of Neset's album Suite For The Seven Mountains states:

Track listing 

All compositions by Marius Neset

Personnel 
People Are Machines
Marius Neset - tenor & soprano saxophones
Magnus Hjorth - piano
Petter Eldh - double bass
Anton Eger - drums

Additional string quartet
Patricia Mia Andersen - violin
Karen Johanne Pedersen - violin
Andreas Birk - viola
Christoffer Ohlsson - cello

References

External links 

Marius Neset albums
2008 debut albums